Douglas Kostynski (born February 23, 1963 in Castlegar, British Columbia) is a retired ice hockey player. He was drafted by the Boston Bruins with the 186th overall pick in the 1982 NHL Entry Draft. He played 15 games for the Bruins.

Career statistics

External links

1963 births
Living people
Adirondack Red Wings players
Boston Bruins draft picks
Boston Bruins players
Brandon Wheat Kings players
Canadian ice hockey centres
Hershey Bears players
Sportspeople from Castlegar, British Columbia
Kamloops Junior Oilers players
Moncton Golden Flames players
New Westminster Bruins players
Ice hockey people from British Columbia